This list of museums in Delaware contains museums which are defined for this context as institutions (including nonprofit organizations, government entities, and private businesses) that collect and care for objects of cultural, artistic, scientific, or historical interest and make their collections or related exhibits available for public viewing.

Current museums

Proposed museums

Defunct museums 
 Delaware Archaeology Museum, Dover, website
 Delaware Toy & Miniature Museum, Wilmington; closed in 2007 due to financial difficulty
 First USA Riverfront Arts Center, Wilmington; closed amid legal dispute in 1999; converted to Chase Convention Center
 Museum of the American Road, New Castle; moved to New London, Connecticut
 Museum of Small Town Life, Dover
 Velocipede Museum, New Castle

See also 

 Botanical gardens in Delaware
 Forts in Delaware
 Historic landmarks in Delaware
 Houses in Delaware
 Nature Centers in Delaware
 Observatories in Delaware
 Registered Historic Places in Delaware

References

External links
Delaware Historical and Cultural Affairs - Museums

Museums in Delaware
Delaware
Museums
Museums